Lucy Jones   (born 1955) is a British painter and printmaker. She was born with cerebral palsy.

Jones is from London and lives in Ludlow, Shropshire.

Career 
Jones was educated at the King Alfred School, London and studied at the Byam Shaw School of Art between 1975 and 1977. From 1976 to 1979 Jones studied at the Camberwell School of Art and then at the Royal College of Arts from 1979 until 1982. In 1982 she won the Prix de Rome prize which allowed her to study at the British School in Rome for two years. Jones had her first solo exhibition, at the Flowers Gallery, in 1987. She has exhibited her work extensively in the UK and abroad. Her work is in many public and private collections including the Metropolitan Museum of Art in New York.

References

External links 
 
 Lucy Jones website

1955 births
Living people
English people with disabilities
Artists with disabilities
English women artists
Artists from London
People with cerebral palsy
Alumni of the Byam Shaw School of Art
Alumni of the Royal College of Art
Alumni of Camberwell College of Arts
People educated at King Alfred School, London